15th clan chief may refer to:
Sir Roderick Macleod of Macleod, 15th Chief
Sir Hector Og Maclean, 15th Chief
Alexander Ranaldson MacDonell of Glengarry